The Custos Rotulorum of Sligo was the highest civil officer in County Sligo during the British administration of the country..

Incumbents

1789-1841 Owen Wynne

For later custodes rotulorum, see Lord Lieutenant of Sligo

References

Sligo